Seyah Lakh (also Romanized as Seyah Lākh; also known as Sayalak and Sīāh Lākh) is a village in Bakharz Rural District, in the Central District of Bakharz County, Razavi Khorasan Province, Iran. At the 2006 census, its population was 443, in 99 families.

References 

Populated places in Bakharz County